Lev Alekseyev (born 18 April 1926) is a Russian former sailor who competed in the 1952 Summer Olympics, in the 1956 Summer Olympics, and in the 1964 Summer Olympics.

References

External links

1926 births
Possibly living people
Russian male sailors (sport)
Soviet male sailors (sport)
Olympic sailors of the Soviet Union
Sailors at the 1952 Summer Olympics – 5.5 Metre
Sailors at the 1956 Summer Olympics – 5.5 Metre
Sailors at the 1964 Summer Olympics – Dragon